St. Nicholas Without is a former Church of Ireland parish church in Dublin, Ireland. For several hundred years the north transept of St. Patrick's Cathedral formed the church, with a wall separating it from the cathedral.

The church
It received its name during the episcopate of Alexander de Bicknor (1317-1349), when the parish of St. Nicholas was extended outside the city so as to include the Manor of St. Sepulchre and the Deanery of St Patrick. The parish was divided into two parts: St. Nicholas Within the Walls and St. Nicholas Without. In records dating to 1509 and 1662 the parish church continued to be the north transept of St Patrick's Cathedral.

The church was dedicated to St. Nicholas of Myra, the patron saint of sailors.

The north transept fell into disrepair in the 18th century, and the Lady Chapel (formerly called the French Church, as it had been used by the Huguenots) of the cathedral was rented by the parishioners of St. Nicholas Without for £30 per annum. The transept was rebuilt in 1822. It was in use up to 1861, when the parish of St. Nicholas Without was united to that of St. Luke. Shortly afterwards the Cathedral was renovated, and the north transept re-built.

The church was subject to the Chapter of St. Patrick's Cathedral.

The parish
The parish was first mentioned in Pope Celestine's Bull of 1191, listing prebends. In documents from the 14th century (1326 and 1382) the extent of the parish was described as taking in both sides of Patrick St. (except Patrick's Close), New St., and most of Kevin St. All the names of house-holders are English, except for one, a man named Begg in New St., described as hibernicus. In 1479 King Edward IV gave permission to John Chevir and other merchants of Dublin to endow a chantry in St Nicholas.

In 1708, an act of parliament was passed, dividing the parish of St. Nicholas Without, and giving part of it the denomination of St. Luke. The two parishes were re-united in 1861.

The cemetery
In 1666 a plot of ground off Kevin St. was set aside for the use of the parish as a burial ground. This became the Cabbage Garden burial ground.

References and sources
Notes

Sources

Former churches in the Republic of Ireland
Church of Ireland churches in Dublin (city)
Saint Nicholas